The Antwerpse Havenpijl is a European bicycle race held in Merksem, Belgium. Since 2006, the race has been organised as a 1.2 event on the UCI Europe Tour.

Winners

UCI Europe Tour races
Cycle races in Belgium
Recurring sporting events established in 1990
1990 establishments in Belgium
Sports competitions in Antwerp